Bassam Kawas is a Lebanese Olympic middle-distance runner. He represented his country in the men's 1500 meters and the men's 800 meters at the 1992 Summer Olympics. His times were a 1:58.71 and a 4:17.40.

References

1969 births
Living people
Lebanese male middle-distance runners
Olympic athletes of Lebanon
Athletes (track and field) at the 1992 Summer Olympics